The 2011 Eastbourne Borough Council election took place on 5 May 2011 to elect members of Eastbourne Borough Council in East Sussex, England. The whole council was up for election and the Liberal Democrats stayed in overall control of the council.

Background
Before the election the Liberal Democrats controlled the council with 20 seats, compared to 7 for the Conservatives, after taking control at the 2007 election. A total of 94 candidates stood for the 27 seats on the council being contested, while 10 sitting councillors stood down at the election, 8 Liberal Democrats and 2 Conservatives. Important seats for control of the council were expected to be Old Town and Sovereign, as well as Hampden Park and Upperton.

Local issues at the election included plans for the redevelopment of the town centre, which was supported across parties, and calls to improve Eastbourne's transport links. However, with the Liberal Democrats in government nationally together with the Conservatives, national government decisions, such as the increase in tuition fees, were also an issue during the election.

Election result
The Liberal Democrats remained in control of the council with 15 seats, but lost 5 seats to the Conservatives. The Conservatives gained all 3 seats in Sovereign ward and also took the 2 seats the Liberal Democrats had been defending in Upperton. This took the Conservatives to 12 councillors, but the Liberal Democrats held on to all 3 seats in Old Town ward after a recount, to keep a 3-seat council majority. Overall turnout at the election was 44.17%, compared to 42.26% in 2007.

Ward results

By-elections between 2011 and 2015
A by-election was held in Meads on 31 May 2012 after the resignation of Conservative councillor Nigel Goodyear. The seat was held for the Conservatives by Caroline Ansell with a majority of 1,318 votes over Liberal Democrat Gerard Thompson.

References

2011
2011 English local elections
2010s in East Sussex
May 2011 events in the United Kingdom